Elections to West Lindsey District Council were held on 2 May 2002. One third of the council was up for election and the council stayed under no overall control.

After the election, the composition of the council was:
 Conservative 13
 Liberal Democrat 13
 Independent 8
 Labour 3

Election result

Ward results

References
 2002 West Lindsey election result
 Ward results

2002
2002 English local elections
2000s in Lincolnshire